Otsego County is a county in the U.S. state of New York. As of the 2020 census, the population was 58,524. The county seat is Cooperstown. The county's population center is Oneonta. The name Otsego is from a Mohawk or Oneida word meaning "place of the rock."

History

In 1789, Ontario County was split off from Montgomery. The area split off from Montgomery County was much larger than the present county, as it included the present Allegany, Cattaraugus, Chautauqua, Erie, Genesee, Livingston, Monroe, Niagara, Orleans, Steuben, Wyoming, Yates, and part of Schuyler and Wayne counties.

Formation
Otsego County was one of three early counties split off from Montgomery (the other two being Herkimer and Tioga) after the American Revolutionary War. Otsego County was officially established on February 16, 1791, with Cooperstown as its county seat.  The original county consisted of three large townships:
 Cherry Valley in the northeast,
 Otsego in the northwest, and
 Harpersfield in the south.

Otsego and Cherry Valley together roughly covered the area of modern Otsego County, while Harpersfield covered the area south of the current county as far as the Delaware River.

The original appointments to Otsego County government positions, made by Governor George Clinton included:
 Richard R. Smith, county sheriff, from Otsego township,
 Jacob Morris, county clerk, from Otsego township,
 William Cooper, chief judge, from Otsego township,
 Jedediah Peck, associate justice from Otsego township,
 Edward Griswold, associate justice from Cherry Valley
 Platt Townsend, associate justice from Harpersfield,
 Alexander Harper, commander of the county militia, from Harpersfield.

New towns
By 1793, four towns had been added to the county by division of the existing towns:
 The Otsego township had been divided into the towns of:
 Burlington in the west,
 Otsego in the northeast,
 Richfield in the north, and
 Unadilla in the south.
 Harpersfield had been divided into the towns of:
 Franklin in the west and
 Harpersfield in the east.

In 1795, a piece of Otsego County was joined with a portion taken from Albany County to create Schoharie County.

In 1797, a piece of Otsego County was joined with a portion taken from Ulster County to create Delaware County.

Geography

Otsego County is in central New York State, to the west of Albany, southeast of Utica, and northeast of Binghamton. The county is part of the Central New York Region and Mohawk Valley Region of New York State. The county is considered by some to belong to the Southern Tier region of New York State, and is the northernmost county of the Appalachian Region.

Adjacent counties
 Herkimer County - north
 Montgomery County - northeast
 Schoharie County - east
 Delaware County - south
 Chenango County - southwest
 Oneida County - northwest
 Madison County - northwest

Demographics

As of the census of 2000, there were 61,676 people, 23,291 households, and 15,115 families residing in the county. The population density was 62 people per square mile (24/km2). There were 28,481 housing units at an average density of 28 per square mile (11/km2). The racial makeup of the county was 95.80% White, 1.75% African American, 0.23% Native American, 0.63% Asian, 0.05% Pacific Islander, 0.50% from other races, and 1.05% from two or more races. Hispanic or Latino of any race were 1.90% of the population. 15.0% were of Irish, 14.9% English, 14.9% German, 11.3% Italian and 9.1% American ancestry according to Census 2000. 95.4% spoke English and 2.1% Spanish as their first language.

There were 23,291 households, out of which 29.60% had children under the age of 18 living with them, 51.10% were married couples living together, 9.50% had a female householder with no husband present, and 35.10% were non-families. 27.00% of all households were made up of individuals, and 11.60% had someone living alone who was 65 years of age or older. The average household size was 2.43 and the average family size was 2.94.

In the county, the population was spread out, with 22.70% under the age of 18, 14.40% from 18 to 24, 24.30% from 25 to 44, 23.60% from 45 to 64, and 15.00% who were 65 years of age or older. The median age was 37 years. For every 100 females there were 93.10 males. For every 100 females age 18 and over, there were 90.00 males.

The median income for a household in the county was $33,444, and the median income for a family was $41,110. Males had a median income of $29,988 versus $22,609 for females. The per capita income for the county was $16,806. About 8.80% of families and 14.90% of the population were below the poverty line, including 15.80% of those under age 18 and 8.20% of those age 65 or over.

2020 Census

Government and politics

|}

Otsego County is generally a swing and bellwether county, having voted for the winner of the national election in every election from 1980 to 2016. In 2004, Otsego County voted 51–48 percent in favor of George W. Bush. In 2008 and 2012, Otsego County voted in favor of Barack Obama. Democrats are prevalent in the City of Oneonta and Village of Cooperstown, whereas the majority of voters in many of the surrounding towns are registered Republicans. In 2020 the county voted for 51%-46% Donald Trump, and lost its bellwether status when Biden won the election.

Otsego County is the only county in New York that names its legislative body the Board of Representatives. It consists of fourteen members elected from  single-member districts. The Board Chair is David Bliss (R). The county also has an elected District Attorney, County Treasurer, County Clerk, and County Sheriff.

Media 
Along with Herkimer County and the eastern portion of Oneida County, northern Otsego County is considered part of the Utica television market, while the Southern half of the county, including the city of Oneonta, is considered to be in the Binghamton television market.

Economy

The Village of Cooperstown (home of James Fenimore Cooper, whose father William Cooper founded it) is located at the south end of Otsego Lake. It attracts many tourists to the Baseball Hall of Fame and the New York State Historical Association museums. Cultural attractions also include the Glimmerglass Opera, with a summer season that draws many repeat visitors for stays.

The primary contributor to the economy is healthcare: Bassett Medical Center, the headquarters of Bassett Healthcare Network and its more than 3,000 employees, is located here.

The City of Oneonta has two institutions of higher education: Hartwick College and the State University of New York at Oneonta; A.O. Fox Memorial Hospital, an affiliate of the Bassett Network; major retail activity; and numerous small businesses.  The county as a whole remains relatively rural, with dairy farming a contributing industry that has consolidated employment in recent years, although production has remained steady.

Communities

City
 Oneonta

Towns

 Burlington
 Butternuts
 Cherry Valley
 Decatur
 Edmeston
 Exeter
 Hartwick
 Laurens
 Maryland
 Middlefield
 Milford
 Morris
 New Lisbon
 Oneonta
 Otego
 Otsego
 Pittsfield
 Plainfield
 Richfield
 Roseboom
 Springfield
 Unadilla
 Westford
 Worcester

Villages

 Cherry Valley
 Cooperstown (county seat)
 Gilbertsville
 Laurens
 Milford
 Morris
 Otego
 Richfield Springs
 Unadilla

Census-designated places

 Burlington Flats
 East Worcester
 Edmeston
 Fly Creek
 Garrattsville
 Hartwick
 Hartwick Seminary
 Mount Vision
 Portlandville
 Schenevus
 Schuyler Lake
 South Edmeston
 Springfield Center
 Unadilla Forks
 Wells Bridge
 West End
 Westford
 Worcester

Hamlets
 East Springfield
 Schuyler Lake
 Silver Lake
 West Burlington
 West Edmeston

See also

 List of counties in New York
 National Register of Historic Places listings in Otsego County, New York

References

Further reading
 Butterfield, Lyman H. "Cooper's Inheritance: The Otsego Country and its Founders", New York History, Vol. 35, No. 4 (October, 1954), pp. 374–411.
 French, J. H. "Otsego County", Gazetteer of the State of New York, Syracuse, New York: R. Pearsall Smith, 1860

External links

  Official Otsego County Government site
 
 Henderson Scout Reservation - Boy Scout Camp serving Otsego County

 
1791 establishments in New York (state)
Otsego County, New York
Counties of Appalachia
Populated places established in 1791
New York placenames of Native American origin